The 2007–08 Drexel Dragons men's basketball team represented Drexel University during the 2007–08 NCAA Division I men's basketball season. The Dragons, led by 7th year head coach Bruiser Flint, played their home games at the Daskalakis Athletic Center and were members of the Colonial Athletic Association.

Roster

Schedule

|-
!colspan=9 style="background:#F8B800; color:#002663;"| Exhibition
|-

|-
!colspan=9 style="background:#F8B800; color:#002663;"| Regular season
|-

|-
!colspan=9 style="background:#F8B800; color:#002663;"| CAA Regular Season

|-
!colspan=9 style="background:#F8B800; color:#002663;"| CAA tournament

Awards
Gerald Colds
CAA Rookie of the Week

Frank Elegar
CAA All-Conference Second Team
CAA All-Defensive Team
CAA Player of the Week

References

Drexel Dragons men's basketball seasons
Drexel
2007 in sports in Pennsylvania
2008 in sports in Pennsylvania